Wonder World 520 is twin skyscraper complex under construction in Zhubei City, Hsinchu County, Taiwan. The project is designed to be a mixed-use complex, housing a Sheraton hotel, 890 residential units as well as a shopping center. Construction of the complex began in 2020 and will be completed by 2023. It will become the tallest building in the city.

See also
 List of tallest buildings in Taiwan
 CIWC Tower

References

Buildings and structures under construction in Taiwan
Skyscrapers in Zhubei
Skyscraper hotels in Taiwan
Residential skyscrapers in Taiwan